Crayford is a town in the London Borough of Bexley.

Crayford may also refer to:
 Crayford focuser, a popular focusing mechanism in amateur astronomical telescopes
 Crayford Engineering, an English automobile coachbuilder